Gimli Peak is a  mountain summit located in the Valhalla Ranges of the Selkirk Mountains in British Columbia, Canada. Gimli Peak is the fourth-highest point in the Valhalla Ranges, with the highest being Gladsheim Peak,  to the north. Its nearest higher peak is Midgard Peak,  to the northwest. The name "Valhalla Mountains" first appeared in George Mercer Dawson's Geological Survey of Canada map published in 1890. Dawson applied names derived from Scandinavian mythology to several of the mountain ranges and peaks in Southern Kootenay. In keeping with the Valhalla theme, this peak was originally labelled "Mount Gimli" on a 1900 Geological Survey of Canada publication, and it was officially adopted April 29, 1998, by the Geographical Names Board of Canada as Gimli Peak. According to Norse mythology, Gimli is the place where the righteous survivors of Ragnarök (doomsday when heaven and earth are destroyed) are foretold to live. Based on the Köppen climate classification, Gimli Peak has a subarctic climate with cold, snowy winters, and mild summers. Winter temperatures can drop below −20 °C with wind chill factors below −30 °C. Precipitation runoff from the mountain drains into tributaries of the Slocan River.

Climbing Routes

Established climbing routes on Gimli Peak:

 East Ridge -  First ascent 1963
 Northeast Ridge -  FA 1969
 South Ridge - class 5.9 
 Northwest Buttress -  class 5.8
 Northeast Buttress/North Ridge - class 5.6
 East Face - class 5.7
 Space Buttress, West Face - class 5.12d
 Lusting After Women, SW Face - class 5.10c
 Slave to Gravity, SW Face - class 5.12-
 Licken It, East Face - class 5.11a
 Sailor Jerry - class 5.10b/c

The classic South Ridge is listed in climbing legend Fred Beckey's book, 100 Favorite North American Climbs.

See also

Gimli (mountain)
List of mountains of Canada
Geography of British Columbia

References

External links
 Weather forecast: Gimli Peak
 YouTube: Climbing the south ridge
 Highlining on Gimli: YouTube
 Valhalla Range photo Gimli centered
 Pbase aerial photo: Gimli

Two-thousanders of British Columbia
Selkirk Mountains
Kootenay Land District